Thomas Mankell "Tom" Rees (March 26, 1925 – December 9, 2003) was an American lawyer and politician who served six terms as a U.S. Representative from California from 1966 to 1977.

Early life and career 
Born in Los Angeles, California, Rees was educated in local public schools. In 1950, he received a B.A. from Occidental College in Los Angeles, California. Beginning in 1951, he attended the University of California Law School. He served in the United States Army and was a lawyer in private practice.

He served as president of Compania del Pacifico, a Latin American export firm. He served as a member of the California State Assembly from 1955 to 1963, the California Senate from 1963 to 1966, and as a delegate to the Democratic National Conventions in 1956, 1960, 1964, and 1968.

Congress 
Rees was elected as a Democrat to the Eighty-ninth Congress, by special election, to fill the vacancy caused by the resignation of United States Representative James Roosevelt, and re-elected to the five succeeding Congresses (January 10, 1966 – January 3, 1977). He was not a candidate for reelection to the Ninety-fifth Congress in 1976. He served as president of Community Development and Management in San Jose, California.

Death
He died on December 9, 2003 in Santa Cruz, California.

References

External links

 Join California Thomas M. Rees

1925 births
2003 deaths
Democratic Party members of the United States House of Representatives from California
Democratic Party members of the California State Assembly
Democratic Party California state senators
American people of Welsh descent
20th-century American politicians
United States Army personnel of World War II
Los Angeles High School alumni